This article details the squads that will participate in the West Virginia Regional of the 2021 edition of The Basketball Tournament, held in Charleston.

Squads

No. 1 Sideline Cancer

No. 2 Best Virginia

No. 3 Herd That

No. 4 Armored Athlete

No. 5 War Ready

No. 6 Team 23

No. 7 D2

No. 8 PrimeTime Players

No. 9 Fort Wayne Champs

No. 10 Bleed Virginia

No. 11 Georgia Kingz

No. 12 Bucketneers

No. 13 HBCUnited

No. 14 Team DRC

No. 15 WoCo Showtime

No. 16 Founding Fathers

References

The Basketball Tournament